Women's tennis has been played in the United States for over a century where several important and famous female tennis players originated.

History
By 1888, American women tennis players were agitating for their own championship competition.  USLTA claimed that they lacked the authority to organise such a competition.
In 1923, the Wightman Cup was created as a national women's tennis competition between the United States and Great Britain.  The trophy for the event was paid for by Hazel Wightman, an American tennis champion.  The location of the cup was alternated between countries on a yearly basis. Great Britain won in 1924, 1925, 1928 and 1930.  In all other years that the cup was contested, the Americans claimed victory.

Important players

Helen Wills Moody was an important American tennis player.  She helped to popularize the overhand serve for women during the 1940s. Alice Marble is another important influential American tennis player.  In 1939, she was a triple champion at Wimbledon.  Her style of play was characterized as masculine because of her aggressive pursuit of the ball during serves and volleys.  Like Helen Wills Moody, others would go on to copy her style of play. Maureen Connolly is an American tennis player who won the Grand Slam of tennis in 1953. In the Open Era, the United States has produced some of the most influential and successful players including Billie Jean King, Chris Evert, Martina Navratilova (defected from Czechoslovakia), Monica Seles (defected from Serbia and Montenegro), Venus Williams, and Serena Williams. The arrival of the Williams sisters is credited as the ushering in of a new era of power and athleticism on the women's tour and 23 time Grand Slam champion Serena Williams is considered by many to be the greatest women's player of all time.

References

Bibliography

See also

 Women's tennis in Australia

 
Tennis in the United States